Whatever Makes You Happy may refer to:
Whatever Makes You Happy, a 2004 album by Jeff Lang
Whatever Makes You Happy, a novel by William Sutcliffe
"Whatever Makes You Happy", a song by Powderfinger from My Kind of Scene
"Whatever Makes You Happy", a song by The Miracles
"Whatever Makes You Happy", a song by Sugababes from Three